Cocksfoot mottle virus (CfMV) is a pathogenic plant virus belonging to the genus Sobemovirus. The virus appears in southern and central England. It is transmitted by beetles Lema melanopa and Lema lichenis  and is common in crops of cocksfoot and cocksfoot/legume mixtures.

Molecular biology
CfMV's P1 protein, required for infection, has been found to interfere with RNAi pathways in plants species such as Nicotiana benthamiana and Nicotiana tabacum.

The polyprotein coat of CfMV is made up of two proteins, encoded by overlapping open reading frames (2a and 2b) which are transcribed through a ribosomal frameshift mechanism. This mechanism is reliant upon a small stem-loop structure and a 'slippery' repeat sequence which allows programmed ribosomal frameshifting.

References

External links
ICTVdB - The Universal Virus Database: Cocksfoot mottle virus
Family Groups - The Baltimore Method

Sobemoviruses
Viral plant pathogens and diseases